Klaus Ofczarek (17 March 1939 – 6 December 2020) was an Austrian tenor opera singer and actor.

Filmography
Tempo (1996)
Inspector Rex (1996–2003)
Stockinger (1997)
Die Neue – Eine Frau mit Kaliber (1998)
Drei Herren (1998)
Julia – Eine ungewöhnliche Frau (1999–2003)
Der Feuerteufel – Flammen des Todes (1999)
Polt muss weinen (2000)
Heimkehr der Jäger (2000)
Die Frau, die einen Mörder liebte (2000)
Happy Hour oder Glück und Glas (2000)
Blumen für Polt (2001)
Die Gottesanbeterin (2001)
Verdammte Helden (2001)
Ich gehöre dir (2002)
Himmel, Polt und Hölle (2003)
Polterabend (2003)
Trautmann (2004)
Der Weihnachtshund (2004)
Klimt (2006)
Freundschaft (2006)
SOKO Donau (2007)
Tatort: Exitus (2008)
Todsünde (2008)
North Face (2008)
 (2009)
Hinter blinden Fenstern (2009)
Lautlos (2010)
Die Wanderhure (2010)
Gottes mächtige Dienerin (2011)
Russisch Roulette (2012)
Hannas Entscheidung (2012)
Tom Turbo – Von 0 auf 111 (2013)
Der Metzger und der Tote im Haifischbecken (2015)
Tehran Taboo (2017)

References

1939 births
2020 deaths
20th-century Austrian male opera singers
Austrian male actors
Actors from Vienna
Musicians from Vienna